Marcelle Slabbert is a South African rugby league player for the Tuks Bulls. His position is wing. He is a South African international, and has played in the 2013 Rugby League World Cup qualifying against Jamaica and the USA.

References

Slabbert
Slabbert
Tuks Bulls players
Rugby league wingers